The Darwin Hills are a mountain range in Inyo County, California, situated near the Argus Range, Panamint Range, and Inyo Mountains. Darwin Falls and the Darwin Falls Wilderness are located in the Darwin Hills. They were named after Dr. Darwin French, a local rancher, miner and explorer. At , the summit of Ophir Mountain is the highest point of the Darwin Hills.

See also
 North American desert flora
 Protected areas of the Mojave Desert

References

External links
 
 Official Darwin Falls Wilderness Area website
 Bureau of Land Management: Darwin Falls Wilderness MAP
 Darwin Falls Wilderness photographs
 Darwin Falls Wilderness – Wilderness Institute

Mountain ranges of the Mojave Desert
Mountain ranges of Inyo County, California
Hills of California
Protected areas of Inyo County, California
Protected areas of the Mojave Desert
Bureau of Land Management areas in California
Mountain ranges of Southern California